Mount Gerlache is a prominent mountain,  high, standing on the northeast side of Larsen Glacier between Widowmaker Pass and Backstairs Passage Glacier, in Victoria Land, Antarctica. It was discovered by the British National Antarctic Expedition, 1901–04, and named for Lieutenant Adrien de Gerlache.

References

Mountains of Victoria Land
Scott Coast